Splendrillia academica is a species of sea snail, a marine gastropod mollusk in the family Drilliidae.

Description
The length of the shell attains 13.7 mm, its diameter 5.3 mm.

Distribution
This species occurs in the demersal zone of the Pacific Ocean off Isla Santa Cruz, Galapagos Islands, at a depth of 60 m.

References

  Tucker, J.K. 2004 Catalog of recent and fossil turrids (Mollusca: Gastropoda). Zootaxa 682:1–1295.
  McLean & Poorman, 1971. New species of Tropical Eastern Pacific Turridae; The Veliger, 14, 89–113

External links
 

academica
Gastropods described in 1971